Vladimír Vačkář (born 6 February 1949) is a former Czech cyclist. He competed in the sprint event at the 1972 Summer Olympics.

References

External links
 

1949 births
Living people
Czech male cyclists
Olympic cyclists of Czechoslovakia
Cyclists at the 1972 Summer Olympics
Sportspeople from Prostějov